LA-27 is a constituency of Azad Kashmir Legislative Assembly which is currently represented by the Sardar Javed Ayoub Khan of PPP. It covers the area of Kutla in Muzaffarabad District of Azad Kashmir, Pakistan.

Election 2016

elections were held in this constituency on 21 July 2016.

Mir attique ur Rehman will win this election with huge majority

Muzaffarabad District
Azad Kashmir Legislative Assembly constituencies